Peacock Chair may refer to:
 The Peacock Chair, a chair designed by Hans J. Wegner in 1947
 Peacock Chair, a public work designed by Frank Lloyd Wright for the Imperial Hotel in 1921–22
 Peacock Chair, a 2009 work by Dror Benshetrit
 Peacock chair, a large wicker chair with a flared back originating in the Philippines